Peach Pass is an electronic toll collection system in use in the U.S. state of Georgia, which is currently used primarily for high-occupancy toll lanes and express toll lanes on Interstate 75 (I-75), I-85, and I-575 in metropolitan Atlanta. Peach Pass can also be used on toll roads in Florida and North Carolina where SunPass and NC Quick Pass are permitted, and vice versa; Peach Pass will soon become compatible with E-ZPass, which is now interoperable with the latter two systems.

In the future, the Peach Pass toll system is expected to incorporate additional proposed express toll lanes along State Route 400 (SR 400) north of I-285, I-20 east and west of I-285, I-75 between I-675 and I-285, and around the perimeter of I-285 between major activity centers surrounding Atlanta, with the intent of easing traffic congestion for suburban commuters traveling inside perimeter city limits during peak commuting times. The goal is to keep traffic moving consistently above  in the express lanes and help reduce traffic congestion in the free lanes as well.

Design 

Peach Pass is an RFID transponder in the form of a sticker that drivers put inside their windshields. Customers may either open a Peach Pass account with a minimum deposit of $20 replenished by a major credit card or debit card, or purchase a "Pay n GO!" Peach Pass at participating CVS or Walgreens locations for $2.50 with an initial deposit of at least $20.

Interoperability 

Georgia's Peach Pass currently works with similar systems in Florida and North Carolina. NationalPass users may use Georgia's facilities as well as those outside the state. PeachPass was originally to be compatible with E-ZPass by 2021, but that date has since been pushed to the 2nd quarter of 2022.

History 

The Peach Pass is the successor to the Georgia Cruise Card, which was used for electronic toll collection at the former toll plaza on SR 400 in Buckhead before tolls were removed in 2013.

Accepted locations in Georgia 

I-75/I-575 Northwest Corridor Express Lanes (between I-285 and Acworth/Canton)
I-75 South Metro Express Lanes (between McDonough and I-675)
I-85 Express Lanes and Express Lanes Extension (between I-285 and northeastern Gwinnett County)

See also 
 Toll road

References

External links 

Electronic toll collection
Transportation in Georgia (U.S. state)